Mikun (Mikuń) is a town in Ust-Vymsky District of the Komi Republic, Russia, located  north of Syktyvkar. Population:

History
It was founded in 1937 as a gulag settlement. Town status was granted to it in 1959.

Administrative and municipal status
Within the framework of administrative divisions, it is, together with the settlement of Shezham, incorporated within Ust-Vymsky District as Mikun Town of District Significance Administrative Territory. As a municipal division, Mikun Town of District Significance Administrative Territory is incorporated within Ust-Vymsky Municipal District as Mikun Urban Settlement.

References

Notes

Sources

Cities and towns in the Komi Republic
Cities and towns built in the Soviet Union
Populated places established in 1937